Prime Mover is a 2009 Australian romantic crime film which stars Michael Dorman, Emily Barclay, Ben Mendelsohn, Gyton Grantley, William McInnes, Anthony Hayes and Andrew S. Gilbert. It is directed by acclaimed film and television director David Caesar of Mullet and Dirty Deeds fame, in which he also worked with McInnes, Mendelsohn and Gilbert.

The film was released to European audiences in Germany on 8 February 2009 and in Australia on 8 June 2009.

Production 
David Caesar first wrote the script in 1983. The Australian Film Commission had provided Caesar money to research the script in Alice Springs and offered him $1 million to make the movie but Caesar felt that he needed $2 million.  In the late 1980s he almost got the film funded through the Film Finance Corporation but was unable and instead made Greenkeeper.

Box office 
Prime Mover grossed $52,119 at the box office in Australia.

See also 
Cinema of Australia

References 

Australian crime films
Australian romance films
Romantic crime films
2000s English-language films
2000s Australian films